The 2017–18 season is Hyderabad cricket team's 84th competitive season. The Hyderabad cricket team and Hyderabad women's cricket team are senior men's and women's domestic cricket teams based in the city of Hyderabad, India, run by the Hyderabad Cricket Association. They represent the state of Telangana in domestic competitions.

Competition Overview

Senior Men's team

Squads
 Head coach: J. Arunkumar
 Assistant coach : Narender Pal Singh
 Physio : Bheesham Pratap Singh
 Trainer : Naveen Reddy
 Video analyst : Santosh BM

Ambati Rayudu moved back from the Vidarbha to lead the Hyderabad while Balchander Anirudh moved from the Hyderabad to the Tamil Nadu and S Badrinath had opted to take a year-off from the first-class cricket ahead of the 2017–18 season. The Hyderabad team also got the new coach with J. Arunkumar replacing Bharat Arun.

Duleep Trophy
Rayudu and Chama Milind got selected for India Red squad while Mohammad Siraj got selected for India Green squad for 2017-18 Duleep Trophy, a first-class cricket tournament in India. Ambati Rayudu missed the tournament because of knee injury while Mohammad Siraj was released from India Green squad as he got selected for India-A series.

Deodhar Trophy
Rohit Rayudu got selected for India A squad for 2017-18 Deodhar Trophy, a List A cricket competition in India.

Indian Premier League
Among 13 players who got their names for the IPL Auction, Ambati Rayudu got picked by Chennai Super Kings and Mohammed Siraj by Royal Challengers Bangalore while local franchise, SunRisers Hyderabad picked Mehdi Hasan and Tanmay Agarwal for 2018 Indian Premier League season.

Buchi Babu Tournament
Hyderabad was invited for 2017–18 Kalpathi AGS - Buchi Babu Invitational Tournament, invitational tournament conducted annually by Tamil Nadu Cricket Association in the honour of M. Buchi Babu Naidu and began their campaign against Baroda at Chennai on 5 September 2017. They topped Group C with two wins in as many matches to advance to knockout stage. They won the tournament defeating TNCA Presidents XI by 8 wickets in final. Kolla Sumanth was later named as the player of the tournament.

Points Table
Group C

Matches
Group Stage

Semi-final

Final

Statistics
Most runs

 Source: 
Most wickets

 Source:

Ranji Trophy

Hyderabad began their campaign in Ranji Trophy, the premier first-class cricket tournament in India, against Maharashtra at Hyderabad on 6 October 2017. They finished in fourth in Group A with two wins, a draw and a loss while two home matches, one against Maharashtra and the other against Uttar Pradesh, were abandoned due to incessant rains.

Points Table
Group A

Matches
Group Stage

Statistics
Most runs

 Source: Cricinfo
Most wickets

 Source: Cricinfo

Syed Mushtaq Ali Trophy

Hyderabad began their campaign in Syed Mushtaq Ali Trophy, a Twenty20 tournament in India, against Kerala at Vizianagaram on 8 January 2018. They finished in fourth in South Zone with two wins and three losses.

Points Table
South Zone

Matches
Zonal Stage

Statistics
Most runs

 Source: Cricinfo
Most wickets

 Source: Cricinfo

Vijay Hazare Trophy

Hyderabad began their campaign in Vijay Hazare Trophy, a List A cricket tournament in India, against Services at Hyderabad on 5 February 2018. They topped Group D with five wins and a loss to advance to knockout stage. They were eliminated in Quarter-finals where Karnataka defeated Hyderabad by 103 runs. Mohammed Siraj was the highest wicket-taker of the tournament with the total scalps of 23 in seven matches.

Points Table
Group D

Knockout stage

Matches
Group Stage

Quarter-final

Statistics
Most runs

 Source: Cricinfo
Most wickets

 Source: Cricinfo

Senior Women's team

Squads
 Head coach: Savita Nirala 
 Physio : Harsha Ganwal
 Trainer : V Keerthi
 Video analyst : Sudha Kumarasena

Senior women's cricket inter zonal three day game
Himani Yadav, Ananya Upendran, Vellore Mahesh Kavya, Gouher Sultana and Sravanthi Naidu got selected for South Zone squad for 2017-18 Senior women's cricket inter zonal three day game, a Women's First-class cricket tournament in India.

One-Day League

Hyderabad began their campaign in Senior women's one day league, Women's List A cricket tournament in India, against Andhra at Hyderabad on 6 December 2017. They finished in third in Elite Group A with a win and three losses.

Points Table
Elite Group A

 Top two teams advanced to Super League. 
 Bottom team relegated to 2018–19 Plate Group.

Matches
Group Stage

Statistics
Most runs

 Source: BCCI
Most wickets

 Source: BCCI

T20 League

Hyderabad began their campaign in Senior Women's T20 League, a Women's Twenty20 cricket tournament in India, against Railways at Mumbai on 13 January 2018. They finished in last in Elite Group B with no wins and four losses and got relegated to Plate Group for 2018-19 season.

Points Table
Elite Group B

 Top two teams advanced to Super League. 
 Bottom team relegated to 2018–19 Plate Group.

Matches
Group Stage

Statistics
Most runs

 Source: BCCI
Most wickets

 Source: BCCI

Telangana T20 League

Hyderabad Cricket Association launched the Telangana T20 League with an initiative to provide major boost to rural cricketers who lag behind due to lack of proper infrastructure and coaching facilities. Many Hyderabad players took part in the inaugural season and Adilabad Tigers won the tournament with Danny Dereck Prince scoring most runs of the tournament and Praneeth Raj taking most wickets.

See also
Hyderabad cricket team 
Hyderabad women's cricket team 
Hyderabad Cricket Association

References

External links
Hyderabad cricket team official site

Cricket in Hyderabad, India
Cricket in Telangana
Sport in Telangana